Klos or KLOS may refer to:
Klos (surname)
Klos, Dibër, a town in eastern Albania
Harketari Klos KF, a defunct football club based in Klos, Dibër
Klos, Elbasan, a village in central Albania
Klos, Mallakastër, a village in south-central Albania
Kłos, West Pomeranian Voivodeship, a village in Poland
KLOS, a radio station in California
Klos C – a ship used to smuggle arms